Slovene peasant revolt may refer to:

 Carinthian peasant revolt, 1478
 Slovene peasant revolt, 1515
 Croatian-Slovene peasant revolt, 1573
 Second Slovene peasant revolt, 1635
 Tolmin peasant revolt, 1713